Hincksiporidae is a family of bryozoans belonging to the order Cheilostomatida.

Genera:
 Hincksipora Osburn, 1952

References

Cheilostomatida